Eckersweiler is an Ortsgemeinde – a municipality belonging to a Verbandsgemeinde, a kind of collective municipality – in the Birkenfeld district in Rhineland-Palatinate, Germany. It belongs to the Verbandsgemeinde of Baumholder, whose seat is in the like-named town.

Geography

Location
The municipality lies in the Westrich, an historic region that encompasses areas in both Germany and France, on the boundary with the Saarland. Eckersweiler is the district's southernmost municipality.

Neighbouring municipalities
Eckersweiler borders in the north on the municipality of Berschweiler bei Baumholder, in the east on the municipality of Thallichtenberg (Kusel district), in the south on the municipality of Reichweiler (Kusel district) and in the west on the municipality of Freisen (Sankt Wendel district, Saarland).

Politics

Municipal council
The council is made up of 6 council members, who were elected by majority vote at the municipal election held on 7 June 2009, and the honorary mayor as chairman.

Mayor
Eckersweiler's mayor is Hans-Peter Bohr, and his deputies are Helmut Rausch and Paul Dinges.

Coat of arms
The German blazon reads: 

The municipality's arms might in English heraldic language be described thus: Per fess argent a demilion issuant from the line of partition azure armed and langued gules, and azure a tower with roof of the first.

The blue lion is a reference to the village's former allegiance to the County of Veldenz. The tower depicts the village's churchtower, which stands under monumental protection.

The arms have been borne since 10 January 1964.

Culture and sightseeing

Buildings
The following are listed buildings or sites in Rhineland-Palatinate’s Directory of Cultural Monuments:
 Evangelical church, Hauptstraße 1 – aisleless church, 1758; west tower with octagonal roof, 1169 or about 1470

Eckersweiler's village midpoint was ranked as worth seeing in Birkenfeld district's local Agenda 21.

Economy and infrastructure
Eckersweiler has a village community centre, and to the south lies the Autobahn A 62 (Kaiserslautern–Trier).

References

External links
 Eckersweiler in the collective municipality’s webpages 
 Brief portrait of Eckersweiler with film at SWR Fernsehen 

Birkenfeld (district)